Some Lie And Some Die is a novel by British crime-writer Ruth Rendell, first published in 1973. It is the 8th entry in her popular Inspector Wexford series.

1973 British novels
Novels by Ruth Rendell
Hutchinson (publisher) books
Inspector Wexford series